Bagabag Airport  is an airport serving the general area of Bagabag, located in the province of Nueva Vizcaya in the Philippines. It is the only airport in Nueva Vizcaya and is classified as a community airport by the Civil Aviation Authority of the Philippines, a body of the Department of Transportation that is responsible for the operations of airports in the Philippines except the major international airports.

It is the closest public airport to the Banaue Rice Terraces at Banaue, the Rice Terraces of the Philippine Cordilleras at Banaue, Mayoyao, Hungduan and Kiangan; the tourist town of Sagada, Mountain Province; and other attractions in the province of Nueva Vizcaya such as the Bayombong Cathedral, Imugan Falls in Santa Fe, Mount Palali and the Capisaan Caves in the Caraballo Mountains and the San Vicente Ferrer Church in Dupax del Sur.

Following years of only seeing limited use by mostly general aviation and military flights, the airport will once again be serviced by regular commercial flights (at a frequency of every four days) beginning 1 June 2017, with Platinum Skies using 31-seater Dornier 328 aircraft chartered by Wakay Tours to carry passengers availing of their Banaue tour packages. The 30-minute flight to Bagabag from Clark International Airport cuts down travel time to Banaue from Manila, normally a 10- to 12-hour drive, by half.

Airlines and destinations

References

External links

 

Airports in the Philippines
Transportation in Nueva Vizcaya
Buildings and structures in Nueva Vizcaya